Gilles Ruyssen (born 18 June 1994) is a Belgian professional footballer who plays for Dender in the Challenger Pro League as a center back.

He made his Belgian Pro League debut on 3 May 2014 in the last game of the 2013–14 season for Gent against K. Lierse S.K. He played the full game in a 4-0 home win at the Ghelamco Arena.

References

External links

1994 births
Living people
Belgian footballers
Belgium youth international footballers
Association football defenders
K.A.A. Gent players
K.V.C. Westerlo players
Lommel S.K. players
RWDM47 players
F.C.V. Dender E.H. players
Belgian Pro League players
Challenger Pro League players